The Lider class, also referred to it as Shkval class, Russian designation Project 23560 Lider for domestic use and Project 23560E Shkval for export, is a combined stealth nuclear-powered guided missile destroyer and cruiser, under consideration for the Russian Navy. Detailed design phase began in 2016–2017, with construction expected to commence after 2020.

In April 2020, the Lider project was reported suspended but in July 2020 was reported to still be moving ahead.

History
Project approval was given in 2013, and in 2015, Severnoye Design Bureau was awarded with a contract for the creation of a smaller non-nuclear and heavier nuclear-powered variant of the future destroyer. In 2016, the Krylov State Scientific Center handed the preliminary design of the destroyer to the Russian Navy. Initially, twelve ships were planned to be built and split between Russia's Northern and Pacific fleets. Later, construction of eight vessels was mentioned.

A May 2017 report indicated that the Lider-class destroyer had been dropped from the Russia's State Armament Programme for 2018–2027 due to financing reductions, however in June 2017, United Shipbuilding Corporation announced the Russian Defense Ministry had approved the preliminary design of the Lider class destroyer.

In February 2019, a decision was made to build the 19,000 ton nuclear-powered variant of the destroyer, instead of the proposed 12–13,000 ton variant equipped with a gas-turbine powerplant. Two vessels should be built by end of the 2020s at a cost of RUB100 billion per vessel. It is believed the construction of the lead vessel could begin as soon as 2023.

On April 18, 2020, Russian newspaper Interfax reported that the Severnoye Design Bureau had suspended development on the Lider. However, in June, Alexei Rakhmanov, head of the United Shipbuilding Corporation, reported that the project was still moving forward.

In an interview on 15 August 2022, Rakhmanov reaffirmed that the project has not been cancelled, and is still under development. However, he also emphasised that the Russian Ministry of Defence will only choose one large warship project for construction, and that they favour the Project 22350M Super Gorshkov frigate due to the favourable performance of the class.

Design
According to Advisor to the General Director of the Krylov State Research Center Valeriy Polovinki, that worked out the destroyer's preliminary design, "The Lider will be a universal ship, triple-hatted as a destroyer, large ASW ship and guided missile cruiser while being smaller than Project 1144 ships and carrying far more weaponry," as reported in The Defence Talk. He further reported the new destroyer "is meant to replace the s, the main anti-surface warships of the Russian Navy, as well as the s and the  anti-submarine destroyers."

The vessels are estimated to displace up to 19,000 tons. In total, they should carry a combination of at least 200 missiles of different variants.

See also
List of active Russian Navy ships
List of ships of Russia by project number

References

External links
Project 23560E Shkval

Destroyers of the Russian Navy
Proposed ships
Destroyer classes